A Bullet in the Gun Barrel is a 1958 French crime film directed by Michel Deville and Charles Gérard.

Cast
 Pierre Vaneck as Tony
 Mijanou Bardot as Brigitte Geoffrain
 Paul Frankeur as Pépère
 Roger Hanin as Dick
 Hazel Scott as herself / La chanteuse de la boîte
 Gérard Buhr as Alberto

References

External links
 

1958 films
1958 crime films
1958 directorial debut films
1950s French-language films
French crime films
French black-and-white films
Films directed by Michel Deville
Films with screenplays by Albert Simonin
1950s French films